Signs of Life may refer to:

Film 
 Signs of Life (1968 film), by Werner Herzog
 Signs of Life (1989 film), a U.S. film

Literature 
 Signs of Life (novel) by M. John Harrison
 Signs of Life, a book of poetry by John Gierach
 Signs of Life, a 1996 book by Cherry Wilder

Music 
 Signs of Life (Billy Squier album), 1984
 "Signs of Life" (instrumental), by Pink Floyd
 Signs of Life (Penguin Cafe Orchestra album), 1987
 Signs of Life (Poets of the Fall album)
 Signs of Life (Steven Curtis Chapman album), 1996
 Signs of Life (Peter Bernstein album), 1995
 Signs of Life (Tara MacLean EP), 2007
 Signs of Life by Arcade Fire, 2017
 Signs of Life, a 1998 album by Martin Carthy
 Signs of Life, an EP by Every Move a Picture
 Signs of Life, a 2004 album by Nemo
 Signs of Life, an album by Beaten by Them

See also 
 Vital signs